Paolo Trapanese (born 7 February 1962) is an Italian former water polo player. He competed in the men's tournament at the 1988 Summer Olympics.

See also
 Italy men's Olympic water polo team records and statistics
 List of men's Olympic water polo tournament goalkeepers
 List of World Aquatics Championships medalists in water polo

References

External links
 

1962 births
Living people
Italian male water polo players
Water polo goalkeepers
Olympic water polo players of Italy
Water polo players at the 1988 Summer Olympics
People from Salerno
Sportspeople from the Province of Salerno
20th-century Italian people